Chandpur  is a city and district headquarter of Chandpur District in Chattogram Division, Bangladesh. It stands on the bank of the Meghna. The city is near the confluence of two of the Padma River and the Meghna River. Chandpur city was established in 1778.

References

Chandpur District
Populated places in Chittagong Division
Cities in Bangladesh